Albert Jean Julien François, Baron Lilar  (21 December 1900 – 16 March 1976) was a Belgian politician of the Liberal Party and a Minister of Justice.

Early life 
Lilar was a renowned lawyer of Admiralty and International Private Law in Antwerp, and Chairman of the International Maritime Committee. He was also a Professor of Law at the Université Libre de Bruxelles and the Vrije Universiteit Brussel.

Career 
In his political life, Lilar was a member of Parliaments for the liberal party, Senator of the Arrondissement Antwerp (1946–1971) and four times Minister of Justice (1946–1947, 1949–1950, 1954-1958 en 1960-1961).  He became Minister of State in 1969.  Under the Gaston Eyskens Government (1958–1960), Lilar was Vice-premier of the Cabinet.

As Vice-Premier, he was elected president of the Round Table in 1960 whose discussions lead to the independence of the Belgian Congo.

A great humanitarian and defender of human rights, no death penalties were carried out under his terms as minister of justice.

Personal life 
He married in 1929 the writer Suzanne Lilar (née Vebist), and fathered 2 daughters : writer Françoise Mallet-Joris (b. 1930) and the 18th century art historian Marie Fredericq-Lilar (b. 1934).

Legacy 
The Albert Lilar Prize from the Comité Maritime International is awarded for a leading work on maritime law published in any language in the world during the previous five years.

External links
Biography and Inventory of the Liberal Archives Albert Lilar (in Dutch)
The Round Table - Congo
More on The Round Table - Congo
Postwar Western Europe 1955-1956
Postwar Western Europe 1956-1957
Independence of the Belgian Congo
Anti-Nazi activities 1936-1939
Freemasonry during Nazi domination in Belgium
FAIB website

1900 births
1976 deaths
Politicians from Antwerp
Open Vlaamse Liberalen en Democraten politicians
Belgian Ministers of State
Barons of Belgium

Belgian Ministers of Justice